The Lake Elsinore Advanced Pumped Storage (LEAPS) project is a proposed 500 megawatt pumped-storage hydroelectricity power project located in Lake Elsinore, California. Combining time-tested large scale energy storage technology and the distinctive geography of Lake Elsinore, LEAPS will provide load balancing and power on-demand to the Southern California grid. LEAPS has been attempting to receive approval from the Federal Energy Regulatory Commission (FERC) since 2008. It has been rejected twice and is working on its third attempt to be approved.

LEAPS 
The Lake Elsinore Advanced Pumped Storage (“LEAPS”) project is an energy storage project designed to help stabilize electricity infrastructure and maximize the use of all forms of renewable energy. With generating capacity up to 500MW, this storage can provide vital “load balancing” to California’s electricity system grid by dispatching energy quickly during peak usage and absorbing and storing unused energy at low-demand times. This load balancing helps prevent power outages. It will also help ensure maximum use of renewable energy resources that would otherwise have to be curtailed in low demand conditions. LEAPS leverages the unique combination of an existing water body, sufficient topographic variation, and proximity to southern California energy markets to construct and operate the most advanced, large-scale pumped hydro storage project in the US to meet California’s growing need for renewable electricity sources. The pumped storage facility serves the power needs of both the San Diego and Los Angeles metropolitan areas; and augments the local economy in the Temescal Valley through: i) significant temporary construction and operations jobs; ii) indirect employment in the hospitality and service sector; iii) payment of municipal and state taxes and fees; iv) contributions through partnerships with community organizations.

California has set renewable energy targets of 50% of total generation capacity by 2030. As a result, renewable, greenhouse gas emissions-free generation and storage capacity is needed more than ever to optimize the contribution of renewable sources such as solar and wind energy. LEAPS is designed to help answer this challenge. California also has a goal of 100% fossil-fuel free electricity by the year 2045. This project will still rely on fossil fuel and will not meet the 2045 standard.

Nevada Hydro filed its Final License Application (“FLA”) with the Federal Energy Regulatory Commission (“FERC”) on October 2, 2017 and is executing a rigorous meeting and review schedule with all relevant agencies in accordance with the terms of the FERC hydro licensing process. In addition, Nevada Hydro is undertaking additional stakeholder communications via its website, project materials, meetings, email bulletins and will be scheduling an open house for residents in the Temescal Valley.

References

External links
 Official website
 Final License Application (“FLA”)
 https://stopleaps.info

Pumped-storage hydroelectric power stations in the United States
Hydroelectric power plants in California
Cancelled hydroelectric power stations
Buildings and structures in Riverside County, California
Cancelled power stations in the United States